Azreen Nabila binti Alias (born 29 June 2000) is a Malaysian athlete.

She competed at the Athletics at the 2020 Summer Olympics – Women's 100 metres. She stated going into the event her goal was to break her personal best of 11.81 seconds which she set winning the 2018 Malaysia Games. She achieved this, running 11.77 seconds and qualifying second from her preliminary heat to reach the first round.

References

External links
 

2000 births
Living people
People from Terengganu
Olympic athletes of Malaysia
Athletes (track and field) at the 2020 Summer Olympics
Southeast Asian Games medalists in athletics
Southeast Asian Games bronze medalists for Malaysia